Sean Maguire (born March 11, 1994) is an American football quarterback. He played college football for the Florida State Seminoles. Maguire is a former graduate assistant at Texas A&M, were he was working under his FSU coach Jimbo Fisher.

Early years
Maguire attended Seton Hall Preparatory School in West Orange, New Jersey. He was rated a four-star prospect by ESPN and a three-star quarterback by Rivals, Scout and 247Sports.com.

College career
In 2013, as a redshirt freshman, Maguire appeared as a third-string backup to Jameis Winston and Jacob Coker. Maguire started one game in 2014 against Clemson Tigers after Winston was suspended due to an off-the-field incident. Maguire led FSU to a 23–17 overtime victory and passed for 304 yards and a touchdown on 21-of-39 pass attempts. His 74-yard touchdown pass to Rashad Greene tied that game at 17–17 with 6:04 left in the fourth quarter. Maguire also played in the fourth quarter of the 2015 Rose Bowl.

On November 16, 2015, Maguire was named Florida State's starting quarterback after the position was initially held at the start of the season by Notre Dame graduate transfer Everett Golson, who had beat Maguire out for the starting position. Maguire played in eight games in 2015, including five as the starting quarterback. He posted a 4–2 record and threw for 1,520 yards with 11 touchdowns and six interceptions, completing 59.3 percent of his passes on the year. Maguire broke his ankle early in the 2015 Peach Bowl, which the Seminoles would lose to the Houston Cougars, 38–24. The Seminoles were ranked No. 9 in the AP poll prior to the Peach Bowl and dropped to No. 14 in the post-bowl poll.

Maguire was expected to retain his positions as Florida State's starting quarterback in 2016, but he sustained a broken bone in his right foot in a preseason practice session. He had to undergo surgery to have a screw put into his foot. Maguire returned halfway through the season and was honored during Florida State's senior night in November 2016.

Statistics

Professional career
Maguire was rated as the 38th best quarterback in the 2017 NFL Draft by NFLDraftScout.com.

After going undrafted, he participated in rookie minicamp with the Tennessee Titans in May 2017.

External links 
 Sean Maguire on Twitter

References

1994 births
Living people
Players of American football from New Jersey
American football quarterbacks
Florida State Seminoles football players
Texas A&M Aggies football coaches
People from Sparta, New Jersey
Sportspeople from Sussex County, New Jersey